

Championships

Professional
Men
1999 NBA Finals: San Antonio Spurs over the New York Knicks 4-1.  MVP: Tim Duncan
 1999 NBA Playoffs, 1998-99 NBA season, 1999 NBA draft
Eurobasket: Italy 64, Spain 56
Women
WNBA Finals: Houston Comets over the New York Liberty 2-1.  MVP: Cynthia Cooper
 1999 WNBA Playoffs, 1999 WNBA season, 1999 WNBA draft, 1999 WNBA All-Star Game
Eurobasket Women Poland def. France

College
Men
NCAA Division I: University of Connecticut 77, Duke University 74
National Invitation Tournament: University of California, Berkeley 61, Clemson University 60
NCAA Division II: Kentucky Wesleyan College 75, Metropolitan State College of Denver 60
NCAA Division III: University of Wisconsin-Platteville 76, Hampden-Sydney College 75 2 OTs
NAIA Division I: Life University (GA) 63, Mobile (AL) 60
NAIA Division II: Cornerstone University(MI) 113,	Bethel College (Indiana) (IN) 109 OT
NJCAA Division I:   Indian Hills CC, Ottumwa, Iowa 100, Barton County CC Great Bend, Kansas 88
Women
NCAA Division I: Purdue University 62, Duke University 45
NCAA Division II: North Dakota State University 80, Arkansas Tech University 63
NCAA Division III Washington (Mo.) 74, St. Benedict 65
NAIA Division I: Oklahoma City University 72, Simon Fraser (BC) 55
NAIA Division II Shawnee State University (OH) 80, University of St. Francis 65

Preps
USA Today Boys Basketball #1 Ranking:  Oak Hill, Mouth of Wilson, Virginia (31-0).  Led by Ron Slay and Travis Watson
USA Today Girls Basketball #1 Ranking: Pickerington, Ohio (27-1).  Led by LaToya Turner.

Awards and honors

Professional
Men
NBA Most Valuable Player Award:   Karl Malone
NBA Rookie of the Year Award: Vince Carter
NBA Defensive Player of the Year Award: Alonzo Mourning
NBA Coach of the Year Award: Mike Dunleavy, Portland Trail Blazers
Women
WNBA Most Valuable Player Award: Yolanda Griffith, Sacramento Monarchs
WNBA Defensive Player of the Year Award: Yolanda Griffith, Sacramento Monarchs
WNBA Rookie of the Year Award: Chamique Holdsclaw, Washington Mystics
Kim Perrot Sportsmanship Award: Dawn Staley, Charlotte Sting
WNBA Coach of the Year Award: Van Chancellor, Houston Comets
WNBA All-Star Game MVP: Lisa Leslie, Los Angeles Sparks
WNBA Finals Most Valuable Player Award: Cynthia Cooper, Houston Comets

Collegiate 
 Combined
Legends of Coaching Award: Dean Smith, North Carolina
 Men
John R. Wooden Award: Elton Brand, Duke
Naismith College Coach of the Year: Mike Krzyzewski, Duke
Frances Pomeroy Naismith Award: Shawnta Rogers, George Washington
Associated Press College Basketball Player of the Year: Elton Brand, Duke
NCAA basketball tournament Most Outstanding Player: Mateen Cleaves, Michigan State
USBWA National Freshman of the Year: Quentin Richardson, DePaul
Associated Press College Basketball Coach of the Year: Cliff Ellis, Auburn
Naismith Outstanding Contribution to Basketball: C.M. Newton
 Women
Naismith College Player of the Year: Chamique Holdsclaw, Tennessee
Naismith College Coach of the Year: Carolyn Peck, Purdue
Wade Trophy: Stephanie White, Purdue
Frances Pomeroy Naismith Award: Becky Hammon, Colorado State
Associated Press Women's College Basketball Player of the Year: Chamique Holdsclaw, Tennessee
NCAA basketball tournament Most Outstanding Player: Ukari Figgs, Purdue
Carol Eckman Award: Susan Summons, Miami-Dade Community College
Associated Press College Basketball Coach of the Year: Carolyn Peck, Purdue
Naismith Outstanding Contribution to Basketball: Margaret Wade

Naismith Memorial Basketball Hall of Fame
Class of 1999:
 Wayne R. Embry
 Kevin E. McHale
 Billie J. Moore
 John R. Thompson
 Fred Zollner

Women's Basketball Hall of Fame

 Class of 1999:
 Senda Abbott
 Lidia Alexeyeva
 Carol Blazejowski
 Joanne Bracker
 Jody Conradt
 Joan Crawford
 Denise Curry
 Anne Donovan
 Carol Eckman
 Betty Jo Graber
 Lusia Harris-Stewart
 John Head
 Nancy Lieberman
 Darlene May
 Ann Meyers-Drysdale
 Cheryl Miller
 Billie Moore
 Shin-Ja Park
 Harley Redin
 Uljana Semjonova
 Jim Smiddy
 Pat Head Summitt
 Bertha Teague
 Margaret Wade
 Nera White

Events
The Hall of Fame opened in 1999 in Knoxville, Tennessee, USA.

Deaths
 May 8 — John Kotz, 1941 NCAA Tournament Most Outstanding Player and player for the Sheboygan Red Skins (born 1919)
 May 31 — Vic Rouse, American college player, national champion at Loyola-Illinois (1963) (born 1943)
 July 8 — Frank Lubin, member of 1936 US Olympic championship team (born 1910)
 August 7 — John Dee, American college coach (Alabama, Notre Dame) (born 1923)
 August 7 — Harry Litwack, Hall of fame college coach of the Temple Owls (born 1907)
 August 19 — Kim Perrot, WNBA Player for the Houston Comets (born 1967)
 October 4 — Ted Strain, American NBL player and national champion at Wisconsin (1941) (born 1917)
 October 8 — John McLendon, Hall of Fame college and ABA coach (born 1915)
 October 12 — Wilt Chamberlain, player and member of Basketball Hall of Fame.  Many believe him to have been the best basketball player in the history of the game (born 1936)
 October 14 — Jim Jordan, All-American at North Carolina (born 1925)
 October 25 — Forddy Anderson, Final Four college coach at both Bradley and Michigan State.  NBA scout for the Boston Celtics (born 1919)
 December 1 — William "Pop" Gates, Hall of Fame Harlem Renaissance and Harlem Globetrotters player (born 1917)
 December 23 — Vladimir Kondrashin, FIBA Hall of Fame Russian coach (born 1929)
 December 24 — Reggie Carter, American NBA player (New York Knicks) (born 1957)
 December 31 — Bob McKeen, All-American college player (California) (born 1933)

References